The 1982 Scotland rugby union tour of Australia was a series of nine matches played by the Scotland national rugby union team in Australia in June and July 1982. The Scotland team won six and lost the other three. They drew the two-match international series against the Australia national rugby union team, winning the first game but losing the second. In their non-international games they were beaten by the Queensland state team and the Sydney representative team. Scotland's win in the first game against Australia was their first victory in the Southern Hemisphere, at the sixth attempt.

Matches

Test matches

Friendly matches

Touring party 

Manager: I. A. A. McGregor
Assistant manager: Jim Telfer
Captain: Andy Irvine

Backs

Forwards

References 

1982 rugby union tours
1982
1982
History of rugby union matches between Australia and Scotland
1981–82 in Scottish rugby union
1982 in Australian rugby union